Arthur Harold Wileman MM (1 January 1886 – 28 April 1918), sometimes known as Nippy Wileman, was an English professional footballer who played as an inside right in the Football League for Chelsea and Burton United.

Personal life 
Wileman's brother Heneage was also a footballer and the brothers played together at Burton United, Chelsea and Southend United. On 16 December 1914, four months after Britain's entry into the First World War, Wileman enlisted in the Football Battalion. After transferring to the Royal Sussex Regiment, he was sent to the front in March 1916. Wileman rose to the rank of sergeant and was awarded a Military Medal for bravery in the field in January 1918. On 28 April 1918, Wileman was killed along with two others during a reconnaissance patrol in the vicinity of the Elzenwalle Chateau, Voormezeele, West Flanders on 28 April 1918. His name is inscribed on the Tyne Cot Memorial to the Missing.

Career statistics

Honours 
Luton Town
Southern League Second Division second-place promotion: 1913–14

References

External links 

 

1886 births
1918 deaths
People from Newhall, Derbyshire
Footballers from Derbyshire
English footballers
Association football inside forwards
Newhall Swifts F.C. players
Burton United F.C. players
Chelsea F.C. players
Millwall F.C. players
Luton Town F.C. players
Southend United F.C. players
Midland Football League players
Southern Football League players
English Football League players
British Army personnel of World War I
Middlesex Regiment soldiers
Royal Sussex Regiment soldiers
Recipients of the Military Medal
British military personnel killed in World War I
Gresley F.C. players
Military personnel from Derbyshire